The African Congress of Democrats (ACD) is a South African political party.

The party describes itself as being committed to leadership that is honest, has integrity, in accordance with the principles and ideals of a moderate left, and working within the established system to improve social justice.

The party contested the 2019 general election, failing to win a seat.

Election results

National Assembly

|-
! Election
! Total votes
! Share of vote
! Seats
! +/–
! Government
|-
! 2019
| 3,768
| 0.02
| 
| –
| 
|}

Provincial elections

! rowspan=2 | Election
! colspan=2 | Eastern Cape
! colspan=2 | Free State
! colspan=2 | Gauteng
! colspan=2 | Kwazulu-Natal
! colspan=2 | Limpopo
! colspan=2 | Mpumalanga
! colspan=2 | North-West
! colspan=2 | Northern Cape
! colspan=2 | Western Cape
|-
! % !! Seats
! % !! Seats
! % !! Seats
! % !! Seats
! % !! Seats
! % !! Seats
! % !! Seats
! % !! Seats
! % !! Seats
|-
! 2019
| - || -
| 0.06% || 0/30
| - || -
| - || -
| - || -
| - || -
| - || -
| - || -
| - || -
|}

References

Political parties in South Africa
Political parties with year of establishment missing
Social democratic parties in South Africa